The Virginia House of Delegates election of 1999 was held on Tuesday, November 2.

Results

Overview 

Source

See also 
 1999 United States elections
 1999 Virginia elections
 1999 Virginia Senate election

References 

House of Delegates
Virginia
Virginia House of Delegates elections